Cheick Yves Doukouré (born 11 September 1992) is an Ivorian professional footballer who plays as a central midfielder for Greek Super League club Aris.

Club career

Lorient
Born in Abidjan, Doukouré moved to France at early age and joined FC Lorient's youth setup in 2007, from FCM Aubervilliers. After featuring regularly for the reserves, he made his first team – and Ligue 1 – debut on 7 August 2010, coming on as a second-half substitute for Yann Jouffre in a 2–2 away draw against AJ Auxerre.

After being rarely used, Doukouré was loaned to Championnat National side SAS Épinal for one year on 27 July 2012. Upon returning, he started to feature more regularly, and scored his first goal for the club on 10 May 2014 in a 1–0 away success over Lyon.

Metz
On 20 June 2014, Doukouré joined fellow first division side FC Metz on a free transfer. He made his debut for the club on 9 August, replacing Fadil Sido in a 0–0 draw at Lille OSC.

Doukouré appeared in 20 matches during the 2014–15 season, as his side suffered relegation. The following campaign, he appeared rarely as his side returned to the main category; in 2017, he also wore the captain armband in some matches.

Levante
On 4 August 2017, Doukouré signed a four-year deal with La Liga side Levante UD. The transfer fee paid to Metz was reported as €1.5 million. He made his debut in the category on 21 August, coming on as a substitute for Enis Bardhi in a 1–0 home win against Villarreal CF.

On 2 September 2019, Doukouré was loaned to Segunda División side SD Huesca for the season.

Leganés
On 23 July 2021, Doukouré signed a one-year deal with CD Leganés in the second division. The following 29 January, he left the club.

Aris
On 29 January 2022, Aris Thessaloniki officially announced the signing of Cheick Doukouré on an 2 1/2-year contract.

International career
After representing France at under-18 and under-19 levels, Doukouré subsequently switched allegiance back to his home country Ivory Coast. On 11 January 2015, he made his full international debut for the latter, starting in a 1–0 friendly win against Nigeria.

Career statistics

Club

International
Scores and results list Ivory Coast's goal tally first.

Honours
Ivory Coast
 Africa Cup of Nations: 2015

References

External links

 
 
 
 
 
 
 

1992 births
Living people
Footballers from Abidjan
Ivorian footballers
French footballers
French sportspeople of Ivorian descent
Association football midfielders
Ligue 1 players
Ligue 2 players
Championnat National players
Super League Greece players
FC Lorient players
SAS Épinal players
FC Metz players
La Liga players
Levante UD footballers
SD Huesca footballers
CD Leganés players
Aris Thessaloniki F.C. players
2015 Africa Cup of Nations players
2017 Africa Cup of Nations players
Africa Cup of Nations-winning players
France youth international footballers
Ivory Coast international footballers
Ivorian expatriate footballers
Ivorian expatriate sportspeople in Spain
Ivorian expatriate sportspeople in Greece
Expatriate footballers in Spain
Expatriate footballers in Greece